Aviz (also Romanized as Āvīz and Avīz) is a village in Ayask Rural District, in the Central District of Sarayan County, South Khorasan Province, Iran. At the 2006 census, its population was 18, in 9 families.

References 

Populated places in Sarayan County